Triphenylcarbethoxymethylenephosphorane is an organophosphorus compound with the chemical formula Ph3PCHCO2Et (Ph = phenyl, Et = ethyl). It is a white solid that is soluble in organic solvents.

The compound is a Wittig reagent. It is used to replace oxygen centres in ketones and aldehydes with CHCO2Et.

References

Organophosphorus compounds